Per Staffan Kronwall (born September 10, 1982) is a Swedish former professional ice hockey defenceman. He played in the National Hockey League (NHL) for the Calgary Flames, Toronto Maple Leafs and Washington Capitals. He also played for Djurgårdens IF and Brynäs IF of the Elitserien, as well as Severstal Cherepovets and Lokomotiv Yaroslavl in the Kontinental Hockey League (KHL). Kronwall was originally drafted 285th overall by the Maple Leafs in the 2002 NHL Entry Draft.

Playing career
Kronwall represented Sweden at the 2002 World Junior Championship, playing seven games for Sweden.

Kronwall was then drafted by the Toronto Maple Leafs in the ninth round, 285th overall, of the 2002 NHL Entry Draft, spending the majority of his first four seasons in North American with the Leafs' American Hockey League (AHL) affiliate, the Toronto Marlies. Toronto later placed him on waivers midway through the 2008–09 season, where he was claimed by the Washington Capitals. He signed later with the Calgary Flames via free agency in 2009.

Kronwall scored his first career NHL goal on October 6, 2009, in a 4–3 win against goaltender Jaroslav Halák of the Montreal Canadiens, but spent the majority of the season with the AHL's Abbotsford Heat. He remained with the Heat to begin the 2010–11 season, but sought to return to Sweden to be closer to his family.  With the blessing of the Flames, Kronwall signed a one-year contract with his former team, Djurgårdens IF, on October 11, 2010. After one season with Djurgården, Kronwall moved to Russian side Severstal Cherepovets of the KHL.

Kronwall played the last eight seasons of his 19-year career with Lokomotiv Yaroslavl, captaining the club for five seasons before announcing his retirement following the 2019–20 season.

International play

Kronwall represented Sweden at the 2002 World Junior Ice Hockey Championships, where he was pointless in seven games.

Kronwall has also represented Sweden several times internationally. At the 2011 IIHF World Championship, he recorded one goal and three assists in nine games and won a silver medal. At the 2012 IIHF World Championship, he recorded one goal and one assist in eight games.

At the 2013 IIHF World Championship, he recorded one assist in ten games, winning a gold medal. At the 2015 IIHF World Championship, he recorded one goal and two assists in six games.

Kronwall represented Sweden at the 2018 Winter Olympics, where he served as alternate captain.

Personal life
Kronwall is the younger brother of Niklas Kronwall, a former defenceman for the Detroit Red Wings.

Career statistics

Regular season and playoffs

International

See also
Notable families in the NHL

References

External links

1982 births
Abbotsford Heat players
Brynäs IF players
Calgary Flames players
Djurgårdens IF Hockey players
Hershey Bears players
Living people
Lokomotiv Yaroslavl players
Ice hockey players at the 2018 Winter Olympics
Olympic ice hockey players of Sweden
People from Järfälla Municipality
Severstal Cherepovets players
Swedish ice hockey defencemen
Toronto Maple Leafs draft picks
Toronto Maple Leafs players
Toronto Marlies players
Washington Capitals players
Sportspeople from Stockholm County